Jaime César Naranjo Ortíz (born 12 September 1951) is a Chilean politician, militant from Socialist Party (PS).

An opponent of the second government of Sebastián Piñera (2018−present), on 8 November 2021, he conducted a filibuster in favor to impeach Piñera, operation which needed the vote of Giorgio Jackson to reach the necessary 78 votes for the initiative to pass to the Senate. In that way, Jackson arrived to the National Congress in Valparaíso around 01:25 AM, moment which he quickly voted.

References

External links
 BCN Profile

1951 births
Living people
Chilean people
Pontifical Catholic University of Valparaíso alumni
20th-century Chilean politicians
21st-century Chilean politicians
Socialist Party of Chile politicians
Christian Left (Chile) politicians